Étienne Juillard (23 February 1914 – 11 November 2006) was a French geographer and scientist.

1914 births
2006 deaths
French geographers
Scientists from Paris
University of Strasbourg alumni
20th-century geographers